Dylan Michael Boyle (born 15 January 2002) is a Northern Irish professional footballer who plays for Curzon Ashton on loan from Fleetwood Town, as a midfielder.

Career
Boyle started his career playing youth football for his local side in Belfast, Ridgeway Rovers, where he spent five years before moving across to England to sign a scholarship for the youth team of EFL League One side Fleetwood Town. 
In January 2020, he signed his first professional contract for the club at the age of seventeen, after impressing the under-18's manager, Simon Wiles. Boyle was captain of the side and had already made his first team debut for Fleetwood in the EFL Trophy defeat to Leicester City U21 in September 2018, having replaced Chris Long as a late substitute. 

On 18 December 2020, he was sent out on loan to Northern Premier League Premier Division side F.C. United of Manchester on an initial one-month youth loan. On 13 August 2021, he was again sent out on loan to the Northern Premier League Premier Division, signing for Bamber Bridge.
He returned from the club on 28 October 2021, having made fifteen appearances, only missing games when he was representing Northern Ireland U21. Brig First Team Manager, Jamie Milligan, was impressed with Boyle and stated "Dylan has been a pleasure to coach and I’m sure he will go onto big things. 

He made his first senior start for Fleetwood against Bolton Wanderers defeat in the EFL Trophy on 30 November 2021, praising interim manager after the match, Stephen Crainey, who had also been his manager for the under-23's in the previous couple of years. He signed a new contract with the club on 31 December 2021, committing to the club on a one-year extension until June 2023, with the club holding an option for a further year.

On 21 October 2022, Boyle joined National League North club Spennymoor Town on a one-month loan deal. In February 2023, he joined Curzon Ashton on loan until the end of the season.

International career
Boyle has represented Northern Ireland at under-17, under-19 and under-21 levels.

Career statistics

References

External links

2002 births
Living people
Association football midfielders
Association footballers from Northern Ireland
Fleetwood Town F.C. players
Bamber Bridge F.C. players
F.C. United of Manchester players
Spennymoor Town F.C. players
Curzon Ashton F.C. players
English Football League players
Northern Premier League players
National League (English football) players